Cameron Spikes (born November 6, 1976, in Madisonville, Texas) is a former American football guard in the National Football League. He was drafted by the St. Louis Rams in the fifth round of the 1999 NFL Draft. He played college football at Texas A&M.

College career
At Texas A&M Spikes was a starting tackle in 1997 and moved to guard in 1998

Professional career

Pre-draft

St. Louis Rams
The Rams drafted Spikes in the fifth round of the 1999 NFL Draft with the 145th overall pick. He played in 19 games for the Rams from 1999-2001.

Houston Texans
Spikes played 12 games with five starts in 2002.

Arizona Cardinals
In 2003 Spikes won a starting job on the Arizona Cardinals, playing in and starting 16 games in 2003 and playing in 16 games (with 9 starts) in 2004.

References

1976 births
Living people
People from Madisonville, Texas
American football offensive guards
Texas A&M Aggies football players
St. Louis Rams players
Houston Texans players
Arizona Cardinals players
Denver Broncos players
Oakland Raiders players